The Seattle Hustlers were a minor league baseball team based in Seattle, Washington and were Seattle's first professional team. From 1890 to 1892, the Seattle Hustlers were charter members of the Pacific Northwest League. Also referred to as the "Blues", the Seattle Hustlers played home games at Madison Park.

History
The Seattle Hustlers were the first minor league team based in Seattle, Washington. On May 24, 1890, the "Hustlers" played the first professional game in Seattle. Seattle defeated Spokane by the score of 11–8 in the contest, held at Madison Park with 1,200 in attendance. For the occasion, the Seattle, Lake Shore & Eastern Railroad ran special trains from Seattle to the end of Yesler Avenue at Lake Washington. From there, two special steamers were provided to take fans to the ballpark.

In 1890, Seattle began play in the Pacific Northwest League, which was a four–team league from 1890 to 1892, featuring the Portland Webfeet, Spokane Bunchgrassers and Tacoma Daisies joining Seattle in league play. From 1890 to 1892, the Seattle team was called the Hustlers as well as the "Blues," with nicknames in early baseball being largely unofficial.

In their first season of play, Seattle finished in 3rd place, their first of three consecutive 3rd place finishes. Playing the season under manager Elmer Rockwell, the Hustlers ended the 1890 season with a record of 48–36, finishing 12.5 games behind the 1st place Spokane Bunchgrassers. The Pacific Northwest League had no playoffs. Pitcher Kid Camp of Seattle led the league with an ERA of 1.08.

In the 1891 season, Seattle again placed 3rd in the Pacific Northwest League. Seattle compiled a record of 45–55, playing under manager Abner Powell and finishing 14.0 games behind the 1st place Portland Gladiators. Kid Camp led the league with 31 pitching wins.

The 1892 Pacific Northwest league became a Class B level league. With a final record of 38–37, the Hustlers placed 3rd under managers Abner Powell and Gil Hatfield, as the team finished 4.0 games behind the 1st place Tacoma Daisies in the final standings. Seattle pitcher Gus McGinnis led the league with 19 wins and 169 strikeouts.

The Pacific Northwest League did not play in 1893. It folded until 1896 as a result of the economic depression, known as the Panic of 1893.

The Hustlers were succeeded in Seattle by the Seattle Yannigans/Rainmakers, who joined the 1898 Pacific Northwest League.

The ballpark

The Seattle Hustlers played minor league home games at Madison Park. Madison Park is still in use today as a public park, located at 4201 East Madison Street, Seattle, Washington. The ballpark itself was across Madison Street from the pavilion.

Timeline

Year–by–year records

Notable alumni

Cal Broughton (1890)
Kid Camp (1891–1892)
Lew Camp (1890)
Billy Crowell (1891)
Fred Demarais (1892)
Andy Dunning (1892)
Billy Earle (1892)
Warren Fitzgerald (1890)
Pat Flaherty (1890)
Ossie France (1890)
Bill Hassamaer (1892)
Gil Hatfield (1892)
Tom Hernon (1890–1892)
Charlie Irwin (1891–1892)
Bill Lange (1891–1892)
Sam LaRocque (1892)
Tom Letcher (1892)
Mike Mattimore (1891)
Jim McDonald (1891)
Gus McGinnis (1892)
Dan Minnehan (1892)
Charlie Newman (1891)
Tom Parrott (1892)
Charlie Petty (1891)
Dick Phelan (1891)
Mark Polhemus (1892)
Abner Powell (1902–1903, MGR)
Jumbo Schoeneck (1891)
Ossie France (1892)
Jumbo Schoeneck (1892)
Skyrocket Smith (1890)
Guerdon Whiteley (1890)

See also
Seattle Hustlers playersSeattle (minor league baseball) players

References

External links
Baseball Reference
 Seattle map for 1891, showing the ballpark, across Madison from the pavilion (item 18)
 Sanborn map for 1905, showing a portion of the old ballpark and its relationship to the pavilion

Defunct minor league baseball teams
Baseball teams established in 1890
Baseball teams disestablished in 1892
1890 establishments in Washington (state)
1892 disestablishments in Washington (state)
Defunct baseball teams in Washington (state)
Seattle